Shai Nitzan was the former State Attorney of Israel, from 2013 to December 2019.

Nitzan headed the commission assigned to investigate the October 2000 events, finding no misconduct on the part of the Israel Police.

The position was vacant from December 2019 to 5 February 2020, when Dan Eldad was appointed to the position.  Avichai Mandelblit had initially objected to Eldad's appointment, but later dropped his opposition. In November of 2021 Nitzan was appointed rector of the National Library of Israel.

References

External links
Articles about Nitzan at Times of Israel

1959 births
State Attorneys of Israel
Living people
Israeli people of Czechoslovak-Jewish descent
Israeli people of Hungarian-Jewish descent
People from Jerusalem